Berhane Deressa was Mayor of Addis Ababa from 9 May 2006 to 30 October 2008.

References

Living people
21st-century Ethiopian politicians
Year of birth missing (living people)
Mayors of Addis Ababa
Place of birth missing (living people)